Briga Heelan (pronunciation  ) (born April 2, 1987) is an American actress and comedian. She is known for her work on the sitcoms Cougar Town, Ground Floor, Undateable, Love, Great News, and B Positive.

Early life and education 
Heelan was born in Andover, Massachusetts, the daughter of actress and Lowell Public Schools teacher Kimball Heelan and playwright Kevin Heelan. She has a brother named Conor. Heelan's father, as well as being a dramatist, has been a faculty member at Phillips Andover Academy since 1983.

Heelan attended Walnut Hill School for the Arts and studied for a year at the Cincinnati Conservatory of Music, before transferring to the University of Southern California. She graduated with a Bachelor of Arts degree in 2009. At graduation, Heelan received the James B. Pendleton Award for outstanding contributions to the USC School of Dramatic Arts.

Career
Heelan intended to focus on musical theatre. She met her Ground Floor co-star, Skylar Astin, at a musical theatre convention.

Heelan's break-out TV role was on Cougar Town. She was credited as a recurring character on Undateable,  appearing in three episodes plus the pilot. She was able to shoot both Bill Lawrence-helmed Ground Floor and Undateable simultaneously  because both comedies are multi-camera, which require fewer production days than single-camera shows. She also guest starred in the first episode of Season 10 of Curb Your Enthusiasm.

Regarding Heelan's role in Ground Floor, TV critic Alan Sepinwall said Heelan is "simply terrific as Jenny: warm and quirky while always feeling like a strong and independent character". The Los Angeles Times said Heelan "makes Ground Floor watchable", describing her as "remarkably alive and in the moment; she makes real all that she touches. I could easily recommend tuning in just to watch her work  and hereby do."

Personal life 
Heelan lives in Los Angeles, California.

On her unusual name, she said, "It's an Irish name. In fact, my last name was O'Heelahan back in the day. And Briga, I read somewhere, is some pagan Celtic goddess, which sounds great, so I really like saying that. But I was named after my grandmother's best friend, who was Irish and came from Dublin."

On October 16, 2014, Heelan became engaged to her Ground Floor co-star Rene Gube. They were married on May 8, 2015. On October 31, 2016, they announced they were expecting their first child, a daughter, due in March 2017. Heelan gave birth to their daughter Bennet Alejandra Gube on March 23, 2017.

Filmography

References

External links
 
 

1987 births
21st-century American actresses
Actresses from Massachusetts
American people of Irish descent
American television actresses
American women comedians
Living people
People from Andover, Massachusetts
University of Cincinnati – College-Conservatory of Music alumni
USC School of Dramatic Arts alumni
21st-century American comedians